Elbert Sidney Smith (October 27, 1911 – April 7, 1983) was an American politician and lawyer.

Born, on a farm, in Sangamon County, Illinois. Smith was educated in the Decatur, Illinois public schools. He went to Millikin University and then received his law degree from University of Alabama School of Law 1936. Smith practiced law in Decatur, Illinois. During World War II, Smith served in the United States Navy. From 1949 to 1957, Smith served in the Illinois State Senate and was a Republican. Smith then served as Illinois Auditor of Public Accounts from 1957 to 1961. Smith served in the 6th Illinois Constitutional Convention of 1969 and was vice president of the constitution convention. Smith died in a hospital in Decatur, Illinois.

Notes

1911 births
1983 deaths
People from Decatur, Illinois
People from Sangamon County, Illinois
Millikin University alumni
University of Alabama School of Law alumni
Illinois lawyers
Auditors of Public Accounts of Illinois
Republican Party Illinois state senators
20th-century American politicians
20th-century American lawyers